Amir-Hossein Aryanpour (February 27, 1925, Tehran – July 30, 2001, Tehran) was an Iranian lexicographer, writer, translator, philosopher, sociologist, and literary figure. Aryanpour was an expert in western philosophy and Persian culture.

Education 
He studied social sciences at the American University of Beirut, graduating in 1944. He later studied philosophy and social sciences at the University of Tehran and received his doctorate in 1951 in Princeton University. He was one of the students of Badiozzaman Forouzanfar, one of the most prominent figures in the history of Persian literature.

Career 
He was a mentor to many, like the Columbia University scholar Hamid Dabashi. Aryanpour was a full professor at University of Tehran. He wrote numerous books and articles on sociology, philosophy and literature. He was influential in the contemporary intellectual movements in Iran. Aryanpour retired from teaching in 1980.

Death 
He died in the morning of July 30, 2001 in Asia Hospital, Tehran, at the age of 77.

Works
 Sociology of Art
 Threshold of Doom
 Psychology of Vision realism
 Field of sociology
 Four bilingual dictionary
 Nature, life, origin and evolution of
 Research Approvals
 Two logic: static and dynamic

See also
 Intellectual movements in Iran
 Persian literature
 Iranology

References

External links
 Persian dictionary

Iranologists
Linguists from Iran
Iranian sociologists
Iranian translators
People from Tehran
Academic staff of the University of Tehran
1924 births
2001 deaths
20th-century translators
20th-century linguists
Iranian expatriates in Lebanon
Iranian expatriates in the United Kingdom
Iranian expatriates in the United States
American University of Beirut alumni
Alumni of the University of Cambridge
Princeton University alumni